Siverly is an unincorporated community in Swan Township, Vinton County, Ohio, in the United States.

History
A post office called Siverly was established in 1869, and remained in operation until it was discontinued in 1898. The community was named for an early postmaster, John Silvery Witherspoon.

References

Populated places in Vinton County, Ohio